Bernard Kyere Mensah (born 1 July 1995) is a professional footballer who plays as a centre-back for Regionalliga Bayern club SpVgg Unterhaching.

Career
Kyere grew up in Kumasi, Ghana, before moving to Freiburg in Germany at age five. There he started playing football with local club Blau-Weiss Wiehre Freiburg at the age of eight. Later he played for the under-17 team of Offenburger FV and was called up for the Southern Baden youth team. In 2012, he was admitted to the 1. FC Kaiserslautern youth academy, and made his debut in the Regionalliga for the reserve team in the 2014–15 season. He made 34 league appearances during the following three seasons, scoring two goals.

On 21 June 2017, Kyere joined 3. Liga club Fortuna Köln after having left Kaiserslautern as a free agent. He made his debut for the side on the opening day of the season, coming on as a late substitute for Daniel Keita-Ruel in a 1–0 victory against VfR Aalen.

After suffering relegation from the 3. Liga with Fortuna Köln in the 2018–19 season, Kyere moved to Cologne city rivals Viktoria Köln on 7 June 2019.

On 23 August 2021, Kyere signed a two-year contract with Regionalliga Bayern club SpVgg Unterhaching. He made his debut for the club on 11 September in a 5–4 shoot-out win against TSV 1860 Rosenheim.

Personal life
He is fluent in German, English and Twi.

References

External links

1995 births
Living people
German sportspeople of Ghanaian descent
Ghanaian footballers
German footballers
1. FC Kaiserslautern II players
SC Fortuna Köln players
FC Viktoria Köln players
SpVgg Unterhaching players
3. Liga players
Regionalliga players
Association football central defenders
Footballers from Accra